The list of popes from the Medici family includes four men from the late-15th century through the early-17th century. The House of Medici first attained wealth and political power in Florence in the 13th century through its success in commerce and banking.  Its members were closely associated with the Renaissance and cultural and artistic revival during this period.

History
The Medici were a powerful and influential Florentine family from the 13th to 17th century. There were four popes who were related to the Medici.

Pope Leo X (December 11, 1475 – December 1, 1521), born Giovanni de' Medici, was pope from 1513 to his death.
Pope Clement VII (May 26, 1478 – September 25, 1534), born Giulio di Giuliano de' Medici, was a cardinal from 1513 to 1523 and was pope from 1523 to 1534. He was a first cousin of Leo X.
Pope Pius IV (31 March 1499 – December 9, 1565), born Giovanni Angelo Medici, was pope from 1559 to 1565.  However, he was only distantly related to the other Medici popes.
Pope Leo XI (June 2, 1535 – April 27, 1605), born Alessandro Ottaviano de' Medici, was pope from April 1, 1605, to April 27 of the same year.

References

Medici

Medici